Łukasz Zejdler (born 22 March 1992) is a Polish professional footballer who plays as a midfielder for Polonia Bytom.

Career

Club
He is trainee of Unia Racibórz. He made his debut in Gambrinus liga for FC Baník Ostrava on 14 March 2011. On 2 August 2012, he moved to the Polish I liga side KS Cracovia on a loan deal.

On 18 August 2020, he joined GKS Jastrzębie.

International
He was a part of Poland national under-19 football team.

References

External links
 
 
 

1992 births
People from Racibórz
Sportspeople from Silesian Voivodeship
Living people
Polish footballers
Poland youth international footballers
Poland under-21 international footballers
Association football defenders
FC Baník Ostrava players
MKS Cracovia (football) players
GKS Katowice players
Chrobry Głogów players
Widzew Łódź players
Chojniczanka Chojnice players
GKS Jastrzębie players
Polonia Bytom players
Ekstraklasa players
I liga players
II liga players
Czech First League players
Polish expatriate footballers
Expatriate footballers in the Czech Republic